The Dr Sun Yat-sen Historical Trail was set up in November 1996 by the Central and Western District Council to commemorate the 130th birthday of Sun Yat-sen. It includes 16 spots in the areas of Central and Sheung Wan in Hong Kong, related to the life of Sun Yat-sen and other revolutionaries in the late Qing era. Originally the Sun Yat-sen Historical Trail had 13 markers; in 2001, it was renovated and renamed, and two spots (now the 1st and the 7th spots) were added to it. In 2018, the trail was further updated under a Revitalization Project, where artists were commissioned by the government to create art at each location.

There are multiple bronze markers embedded in sidewalks and handrails throughout the city, noting the trail. Although about 600m north of the trail, the Sun Yat Sen Memorial Park in Sai Ying Pun contains a large concrete map of the trail near its main gate.  The Dr Sun Yat-sen Museum was opened in 2006 and is about 200m south of the trail.

See also
 Heritage Trails in Hong Kong
 Dr Sun Yat-sen Museum, near the trail
Sun Yat Sen Memorial Park
Red House (Hong Kong)

References

External links

 Brochures of the Dr Sun Yat-sen Historical Trail (.pdf documents): brochure part 1, brochure part 2, leaflet, map

 

Central, Hong Kong
Sheung Wan
Heritage conservation in Hong Kong
Monuments and memorials in Hong Kong